Peacetime (Portuguese: Tempos de Paz) is a 2009 Brazilian drama film, directed by Daniel Filho. The film is based on the play Novas Diretrizes em Tempos de Paz, written by Bosco Brasil.

Plot
Segismundo (Tony Ramos) is a former political police officer of Getúlio Vargas' government, who used to torture prisoners. In April 1945, he is the chief of the Immigration Office in Rio de Janeiro and, therefore, is in charge of preventing the entry of Nazis. Then, the Polish Clausewitz (Dan Stulbach) must convince him that he is a victim in order to gain access to the country.

Peacetime is a film that turns a very complex issue (i.e. immigration) into a simple story of a day that changes the lives of two men.

References

External links
 

2009 drama films
2009 films
Brazilian drama films
Films about security and surveillance
Brazilian films based on plays
Films directed by Daniel Filho
Films set in 1945
Films set in Rio de Janeiro (city)
Films shot in Rio de Janeiro (city)
2000s Portuguese-language films
World War II films